The Laughing Cavalier is a 1913 adventure novel by Baroness Orczy, which revolves around Percy Blakeney, a foreign adventurer and ancestor of Orczy's famous character, the Scarlet Pimpernel. The story takes place in Holland in 1623/1624 and is partly inspired by Frans Hals' painting The Laughing Cavalier: in the novel, Blakeney is Frans Hals' adopted son and the man who poses for the painting of the Laughing Cavalier.

The sequel to this book, continuing the story of Percy Blakeney, is The First Sir Percy.

Plot summary
In March 1623, the Dutch nobleman Willem van Oldenbarnevelt, Lord of Stoutenburg, is on the run. His father, the statesman Johan van Oldenbarnevelt ("John of Barneveld" in the book) was falsely accused of treason and sent to the gallows by the Stadtholder, Maurice of Nassau, Prince of Orange in 1619; and his brother Reinier van Oldenbarnevelt, the lord of Groeneveld, has since been arrested and executed for plotting to kill the Prince. Stoutenburg is now a fugitive and determined to get his revenge.

Stoutenburg asks for shelter from Gilda Beresteyn, the daughter of a rich merchant. Gilda was once in love with Stoutenburg, but has never forgiven him for abandoning her to make a more profitable marriage. Despite her reservations she shelters him for a short time, but eventually she sends him away, knowing that her father, a friend of the Prince of Orange, will not approve.

Nine months later, Gilda is walking through Haarlem to the New Year's Eve service and sees three foreign adventurers intervening to protect a Spanish woman who is being attacked by a mob. After the fracas is over, Gilda speaks to the three men. They are mercenaries who call themselves after famous philosophers: "Diogenes," "Socrates," and "Pythagoras." Gilda is attracted to "Diogenes" (really Percy Blakeney, the illegitimate son of an English nobleman and a Dutch woman), but he offends her by taking his leave and going off to a pub.

Gilda continues to church but cannot stop thinking about the mysterious, infuriating stranger. She stays behind after the service to pray, but is disturbed by a secret meeting between Stoutenburg and his allies, including Gilda's brother Nicolaes. Fueled by rage, Stoutenburg shouts out his plan to murder the Prince.

Nicolaes follows Gilda out of the church and it soon becomes apparent that she has overheard everything. She begs her brother to reconsider his part in the plot, but he refuses and instead asks her to swear that she will not tell their father. She also refuses, but Nicolaes still tells the rest of the group that she can be trusted not to betray them. Stoutenburg is not convinced and persuades Nicolaes to send Gilda away for a few days, so they can kill the Stadtholder before she can tell anyone.

Nicolaes, who has seen Diogenes in the pub, follows him to Frans Hals' house and hires him to kidnap Gilda. After seeing her portrait, Diogenes recognises her as the lady he met the night before. With the help of the Spanish woman he saved from the mob, Diogenes bundles Gilda and her maid into a sledge and takes her out of Haarlem. He leaves her under the care of Socrates and Pythagoras for the night and returns to Haarlem, where he is sitting for a painting by Hals. Afterwards, in the pub, he meets Gilda's distraught father. Nicolaes is furious at Diogenes' appearance back in Haarlem, but can say nothing for fear of giving away his role in his sister's kidnapping. Caught between the two men, Diogenes finds himself promising Gilda's father that he will seek out Gilda and return her to him. 

One word from Gilda could send Diogenes to the gallows, yet despite her vehement verbal attacks on him, he is starting to have deep feelings for her, something which won't please Stoutenburg, who is still determined to marry her.

References

External links
 
 

1913 British novels
Scarlet Pimpernel books
Novels by Baroness Emma Orczy
Fiction set in 1623
Fiction set in 1624
Novels set in the Netherlands
Hodder & Stoughton books
Novels set in the 1620s